The Fort is a historic restaurant in Morrison, Colorado.  The structure was inspired by Bent's Fort.

In 1997 the restaurant hosted President Bill Clinton’s state dinner for the 23rd G8 summit.

See also
National Register of Historic Places listings in Jefferson County, Colorado

References

Sources
National Register of Historic Places
Restaurant Picks In Morrison, Boulder, Other Locales

External links

Official site

Tourist attractions in Jefferson County, Colorado
Restaurants in Colorado
Commercial buildings on the National Register of Historic Places in Colorado
Buildings and structures in Jefferson County, Colorado
National Register of Historic Places in Jefferson County, Colorado
Restaurants on the National Register of Historic Places
1963 establishments in Colorado
Restaurants established in 1963
Pueblo Revival architecture in Colorado